"Kinda Like a Big Deal" is the street single from rap duo Clipse's third studio album Til the Casket Drops. It features Kanye West.

Song information
The track was released online on Clipse's PlayCloths clothing line's blog on April 20, 2009. KAWS designed the single cover for the song.

An official remix featuring Bun B was leaked April 30, 2009.

A freestyle was made by Kid Cudi on the instrumental called "Excuse My Mood" that was released on June 16, 2009.

Kanye's verse was supposed to be on T.I.'s song "On Top of the World" off the album Paper Trail, but his verse was replaced with Ludacris's verse.

London rapper Kano featured a rap over the beat on his Jack Bauer Mixtape

Music video
A music video was released on June 23, 2009.

Charts

External links
Music video for "Kinda Like a Big Deal"

References

2009 singles
Clipse songs
Kanye West songs
Columbia Records singles
Songs written by Kanye West
Song recordings produced by DJ Khalil
Songs written by Pusha T
2009 songs
Songs written by DJ Khalil